This article contains the family trees of members of the Cao clan, who ruled the state of Cao Wei (220–265) in the Three Kingdoms period (220–280) in China. Only Cao Cao's lineage is shown in this article. The lineages of his relatives, such as Cao Ren, Cao Zhen and others, are not included here.

Cao Song

Cao Song was a foster son of the eunuch Cao Teng and he had at least four sons: Cao Cao, Cao Bin, Cao De, and a fourth one whose personal name was not recorded and was only known by his posthumous title "Marquis Ai of Haiyang". The marquis's daughter married Xiahou Yuan's eldest son Xiahou Heng.

Cao Cao, his wives, and his children

Lady Bian

Cao Cao and Lady Bian had four sons: Cao Pi, Cao Zhang, Cao Zhi and Cao Xiong.

Cao Xiong was succeeded by his son Cao Bing. Cao Bing had no heir.

Cao Zhang

Cao Zhang married Sun Ben's daughter (personal name unknown). Cao Zhang's son was Cao Kai. Cao Zhang also had a daughter (personal name unknown) who married Wang Chang. It is not known whether Cao Zhang's two children were born to Lady Sun (Sun Ben's daughter) or not.

Cao Zhi

Cao Zhi married the daughter of Cui Yan's elder brother. He had two sons — Cao Miao and Cao Zhi (courtesy name "Yungong"). He also had two daughters — Cao Jinhu and Cao Xingnü. It is not known whether Cao Zhi's four children were born to Lady Cui or not.

Lady Liu

Cao Cao and Lady Liu had two sons and a daughter: Cao Ang, Cao Shuo and Princess Qinghe (personal name unknown). Princess Qinghe married Xiahou Dun's son Xiahou Mao.

Cao Ang's successor was Cao Wan, a son of his half-brother Cao Jun (曹均). Cao Wan's son was Cao Lian. Cao Shuo's successor was Cao Song, a son of his half-brother Cao Mao (曹茂).

Lady Huan

Cao Cao and Lady Huan had three sons: Cao Chong, Cao Ju and Cao Yu.

Cao Chong's successor was Cao Cong, a son of his brother Cao Ju. Cao Yu's son was Cao Huan. Cao Huan married Bian Lin's daughter Empress Bian. Bian Lin was a son of Bian Bing, a younger brother of Lady Bian (another of Cao Cao's wives).

Lady Du

Cao Cao and Lady Du had two sons: Cao Lin and Cao Gun. Lady Du and her ex-husband Qin Yilu had a son, Qin Lang, who was adopted by Cao Cao after his mother's remarriage.

Cao Gun's son was Cao Fu. Cao Lin had a son (Cao Wei) and a daughter (personal name unknown). The daughter married Ji Kang.

Lady Qin

Cao Cao and Lady Qin had two sons: Cao Xuan and Cao Jun.

Cao Xuan's successor was Cao Zan, a son of his half-brother Cao Lin. Cao Zan's successor was his younger brother Cao Yi. Cao Yi's son was Cao Heng.

Cao Jun's son was Cao Ao.

Lady Yin

Cao Cao and Lady Yin had a son: Cao Ju. Lady Yin and her ex-husband He Xian, a son of He Jin, had a son, He Yan, who was adopted by Cao Cao after his mother's remarriage. He Yan married Cao Cao's daughter Princess Jinxiang (personal name unknown).

Cao Ju's successor was Cao Min, a son of his half-brother Cao Jun (曹均). Cao Min's son was Cao Kun.

Consort Sun

Cao Cao and Consort Sun had three sons: Cao Zishang, Cao Ziqin and Cao Biao.

Both Cao Zishang and Cao Ziqin died without heirs. Cao Biao was succeeded by his son Cao Jia.

Consort Li

Cao Cao and Consort Li had three sons: Cao Zicheng, Cao Zizheng and Cao Zijing.

Both Cao Zicheng and Cao Zijing died without heirs. Cao Zizheng's successor was Cao Fan, a son of his half-brother Cao Ju (曹據). Cao Fan was succeeded by his younger brother Cao Chan.

Cao Cao's other wives and children

Cao Cao had five other sons who were born to five different mothers: Consort Zhou bore Cao Jun; Consort Liu bore Cao Ziji; Consort Song bore Cao Hui; Consort Zhao bore Cao Mao; Lady Chen bore Cao Gan. Cao Cao also had two other wives: Lady Wang, who raised Cao Gan after Lady Chen's death; Lady Ding, who raised Cao Ang after the death of Lady Liu (Cao Ang's biological mother). Cao Cao also had four daughters whose mothers were not known: Cao Xian, Cao Jie, Cao Hua and Princess Anyang (personal name unknown). Cao Xian, Cao Jie and Cao Hua married Liu Xie (Emperor Xian of Han) while Princess Anyang married Xun Yu's son Xun Yun.

Cao Ziji died without an heir. Cao Jun was succeeded by his son Cao Kang, who in turn was succeeded by his son Cao Chen. Cao Hui was succeeded by his son Cao Xi. Cao Xi's son was Cao Kun.

Cao Pi, his wives, and his children

Lady Zhen

Cao Pi and Lady Zhen had a son and a daughter: Cao Rui and Princess Dongxiang (personal name unknown).

Consort Xu

Cao Pi and Consort Xu had a son: Cao Li. Cao Li's successor was Cao Ti, a son of his cousin Cao Kai (Cao Zhang's son).

Ladies Pan, Zhu, and Qiu

Three of Cao Pi's wives: Lady Pan, Lady Zhu and Lady Qiu - bore him children as such: Lady Pan bore Cao Rui; Lady Zhu bore Cao Jian; Lady Qiu bore Cao Lin.

Cao Rui's successor was Cao Zan, a son of Cao Min, Cao Ju's heir and Prince of Langya. Cao Jian had no heir. Cao Lin had two sons: Cao Qi and Cao Mao. Cao Mao married Empress Bian, Bian Long's daughter. Bian Long was Bian Lan's son, Bian Lan was Bian Bing's son. Bian Bing was a younger brother of Cao Pi's mother Lady Bian.

Consorts Li, Su, Zhang, and Song

Four of Cao Pi's wives – Consorts Li, Su, Zhang and Song – bore him children as such: Consort Li bore Cao Xie; Consort Su bore Cao Yong; Consort Zhang bore Cao Gong; Consort Song bore Cao Yan.

Cao Xie's son was Cao Xun. Cao Yong's successor was Cao Wen, a son of his cousin Cao Kai (Cao Zhang's son). Both Cao Gong and Cao Yan died without heirs.

Cao Pi's other wives and children

Cao Pi had seven other wives: the two Ladies Liu, Consort Yin, Consort Chai, Lady Ren, Lady Li and Guo Nüwang. The two Ladies Liu were the daughters of Liu Xie (Emperor Xian of Han). Guo Nüwang was the daughter of Guo Yong and Lady Dong.

Cao Pi had a son, Cao Jie. The identity of Cao Jie's mother is not known.

Cao Rui

Cao Rui had five wives: Empress Mao, Empress Guo, Lady Zhang, Lady He and Lady Yu. Empress Mao was Mao Jia's daughter and she had a younger brother, Mao Zeng. Empress Guo was the daughter of Guo Man and Lady Du.

Cao Rui had three sons (Cao Jiong, Cao Mu and Cao Yin) and two daughters (Cao Shu and the First Princess of Qi). The First Princess of Qi (personal name unknown) married Li Feng's son Li Tao (李韜) initially, but was later remarried to Ren Kai.

Cao Rui also had two adoptive sons: Cao Fang and Cao Xun, who were allegedly the sons of Cao Zhang's son, Cao Kai (曹楷).

Cao Fang

Cao Fang had eight wives: Empress Zhen, a granddaughter of Zhen Yan (Lady Zhen's elder brother); Empress Zhang, a daughter of Zhang Ji (Jingzhong); Empress Wang, Wang Kui's daughter; Lady Zhang; Lady Xing, who later remarried Sun Huan's son Sun Yi (孫壹); Li Hua, Liu Xun; Yuwan.

See also
 Eastern Wu family trees
 Shu Han family trees
 Family tree of Sima Yi

References

 Chen, Shou. Records of the Three Kingdoms (Sanguozhi).
 Fan, Ye. Book of the Later Han (Houhanshu).
 Fang, Xuanling. Book of Jin (Jin Shu).
 Pei, Songzhi. Annotations to Records of the Three Kingdoms (Sanguozhi zhu).

Cao Wei
Dynasty genealogy